Elections to Armagh District Council were held on 18 May 1977 on the same day as the other Northern Irish local government elections. The election used four district electoral areas to elect a total of 20 councillors.

Election results

Note: "Votes" are the first preference votes.

Districts summary

|- class="unsortable" align="centre"
!rowspan=2 align="left"|Ward
! % 
!Cllrs
! % 
!Cllrs
! %
!Cllrs
! %
!Cllrs
! % 
!Cllrs
!rowspan=2|TotalCllrs
|- class="unsortable" align="center"
!colspan=2 bgcolor="" | UUP
!colspan=2 bgcolor="" | SDLP
!colspan=2 bgcolor="" | DUP
!colspan=2 bgcolor="" | UUUP
!colspan=2 bgcolor="white"| Others
|-
|align="left"|Area A
|bgcolor="40BFF5"|37.2
|bgcolor="40BFF5"|2
|33.2
|1
|23.0
|1
|6.6
|0
|0.0
|0
|4
|-
|align="left"|Area B
|bgcolor="40BFF5"|47.1
|bgcolor="40BFF5"|3
|15.4
|1
|20.7
|1
|9.8
|1
|7.0
|0
|6
|-
|align="left"|Area C
|36.9
|2
|bgcolor="#99FF66"|51.7
|bgcolor="#99FF66"|3
|0.0
|0
|0.0
|0
|11.4
|0
|5
|-
|align="left"|Area D
|bgcolor="40BFF5"|30.5
|bgcolor="40BFF5"|2
|28.5
|2
|7.0
|0
|0.0
|0
|34.0
|1
|5
|- class="unsortable" class="sortbottom" style="background:#C9C9C9"
|align="left"| Total
|38.8
|9
|30.3
|7
|12.8
|2
|4.5
|1
|13.6
|1
|20
|-
|}

Districts results

Area A

1973: 2 x UUP, 1 x DUP, 1 x Independent
1977: 2 x UUP, 1 x DUP, 1 x SDLP
1973-1977 Change: SDLP gain from Independent

Area B

1973: 4 x UUP, 1 x DUP, 1 x SDLP
1977: 3 x UUP, 1 x DUP, 1 x SDLP, 1 x UUUP
1973-1977 Change: UUUP gain from UUP

Area C

1973: 2 x SDLP, 2 x UUP, 1 x Alliance
1977: 3 x SDLP, 2 x UUP
1973-1977 Change: SDLP gain from Alliance

Area D

1973: 3 x UUP, 2 x SDLP
1977: 2 x UUP, 2 x SDLP, 1 x Independent Nationalist
1973-1977 Change: SDLP gain from UUP, Independent Nationalist leaves SDLP

References

Armagh City and District Council elections
Armagh